Misaki Yabumoto is a Japanese karateka. She won the gold medal in the women's team kata event at the 2021 World Karate Championships held in Dubai, United Arab Emirates. A month later, she won the gold medal in this event at the 2021 Asian Karate Championships held in Almaty, Kazakhstan.

Achievements

References 

Living people
Year of birth missing (living people)
Place of birth missing (living people)
Japanese female karateka
21st-century Japanese women